Melt van der Spuy Hanekom (27 July 1931 – 8 October 1997) was a South African rugby union player.

Playing career
Hanekom was born and raised in Moorreesburg.

Hanekom toured with the Springboks to Australia and New Zealand in 1956. During the second match on tour, he broke his leg, but he did not leave the field and finished the match with the broken leg. The broken leg kept him off the field for just three weeks, after which he resumed his tour. Hanekom did not play in any test matches, but did play in nine tour matches and scored three tries.

See also
List of South Africa national rugby union players – Springbok no. 333

References

1931 births
1997 deaths
Boland Cavaliers players
Rugby union players from Moorreesburg
South Africa international rugby union players
South African rugby union players
Rugby union hookers